

A
Irving Aaronson (1895–1963)
Louis Armstrong (1901–1971) (Louis Armstrong and His Orchestra, 1928–1947)
Toshiko Akiyoshi (born 1929) (Toshiko Akiyoshi – Lew Tabackin Big Band)
Ray Anthony (born 1922)
Lil Hardin Armstrong (1898-1971)
Georgie Auld (1919-1990) (Georgie Auld and His Orchestra, Georgie Auld and His Hollywood All Stars)

B
Charlie Barnet (1913-1991)
Count Basie (1904–1984) (Count Basie Orchestra, 1934–1984)
Louie Bellson (1924-2009)
Bunny Berigan (1908-1942)
Carla Bley (born 1936)
Will Bradley (1912-1989)
Les Brown (1912-2001) (Les Brown and His Band of Renown) (1938–2001)

C
Joe Cabot (1921-2016)
Cab Calloway (1907–1994) (Cab Calloway Orchestra)
Frankie Carle (1903-2001)
Benny Carter (1907-2003)
Larry Clinton (1909-1985)
Harry Connick, Jr. (born 1967)
Hank Crawford (1934-2009)
Bob Crosby (1913-1993)

D
Tommy Dorsey (1905–1956) (Dorsey Brothers Orchestra) (1928–1956), Tommy Dorsey Orchestra (1935–1956)
Jimmy Dorsey (1904–1957) (Dorsey Brothers Orchestra (1928–1956),  Jimmy Dorsey and His Orchestra)
Eddy Duchin (1909–1951) (Eddy Duchin and His Orchestra)

E
Billy Eckstine (1914-1993)
Les Elgart (1917-1995)
Duke Ellington (1899–1974) (Duke Ellington Orchestra)
Mercer Ellington (1919-1996)
Don Ellis (1934-1978)
Ziggy Elman (1914-1968) (Ziggy Elman and His Orchestra)
Gil Evans (1912–1988)

F
Maynard Ferguson (1928–2006)
Jerry Fielding (1922-1980)
Shep Fields (1910–1981) (Shep Fields and His Rippling Rhythm)
Brent Fischer (born 1964)
Bob Florence (1932-2008) (the Limited Edition)

G
Jan Garber (1897–1977) (Jan Garber Orchestra)
Terry Gibbs (born 1924)
Dizzy Gillespie (1917-1993)
Benny Goodman (1909–1986) (Benny Goodman and His Orchestra, 1932–1952)
Gordon Goodwin (born 1954) (Big Phat Band)
Glen Gray (1900-1963) (Casa Loma Orchestra) (1927-1963)
George Gee (George Gee Swing Orchestra; formerly known as the Make-Believe Ballroom Orchestra)

H
Henry Halstead  (1897–1984)
Lionel Hampton (1908-2002)
Slide Hampton (born 1932) (Slide Hampton Ultra Big Band)
Erskine Hawkins (1914–1993)
Horace Heidt (1901-1986)
Neal Hefti (1922-2008)
Fletcher Henderson (1897–1952)
Woody Herman (1913–1987)
Teddy Hill (1909-1978)
Tiny Hill (1906-1971)
Earl Hines (1903-1983)
Claude Hopkins (1903-1984)
Pee Wee Hunt (1907-1979)
Lloyd Hunter (1910-1961)
Ina Ray Hutton (1916-1984) (Melodears)

I
Tommy Igoe (born 1964) (The Birdland Big Band)

J
Harry James (1916–1983)
Galen Jeter (Dallas Jazz Orchestra)
Dick Johnson (clarinetist) (1925-2010)
Isham Jones (1894–1956)
Quincy Jones (born 1933)
Thad Jones (1923–1986) (The Thad Jones/Mel Lewis Orchestra) (c.1965-1977)
Louis Jordan (1908–1975)

K
Sammy Kaye (1910–1987)
Stan Kenton (1911–1979)
Wayne King (1901–1985)
Andy Kirk (1898-1992) (Twelve Clouds of Joy)
Gene Krupa (1909-1973)
Tom Kubis (born 1951)
Kay Kyser (1905–1985)

L
Kevin Chad Layer (Born 1988)
Mel Lewis (1929–1990) (The Thad Jones/Mel Lewis Orchestra) (c.1965-1977))
Ted Lewis (1890–1971)
Guy Lombardo (1902–1977)
Johnny Long (1914-1972)
Vincent Lopez (1896–1975)
Jimmie Lunceford (1902–1947)

M
Rob McConnell (1935-2010) (the Boss Brass)
Ray McKinley (1910-1995)
Hal McIntyre (1914-1959)
Richard Maltby (1914-1991)
Gap Mangione (born 1938)
Ralph Marterie (1914-1978)
Freddy Martin (1906-1983)
Frankie Masters (1904–1991)
Billy May (1916–2004)
Glenn Miller (1904–1944) (Glenn Miller Orchestra, 1937–1942)
Lucky Millinder (1900–1966)
Charles Mingus (1922-1979)
Bob Mintzer (born 1953) (Bob Mintzer Big Band)
Vaughn Monroe (1911–1973)
Russ Morgan (1904–1969)
Bennie Moten (1894-1935) (Kansas City Orchestra)
Gerry Mulligan (1927-1996) (Concert Jazz Band)

N
Ray Nance (1913-1976)
Ozzie Nelson  (1906-1975) 
Red Nichols (1905–1965)
Ray Noble (1903–1978)
Red Norvo (1908-1999)

O
Joe "King" Oliver (1885–1938)
Kid Ory (1886–1973)

P
Tony Pastor (1907–1969)
George Paxton (1914-1989)
Fats Pichon (1906–1967)
Ben Pollack (1903–1971)
Perez Prado (1916-1989)
Louis Prima (1910-1978)
Paul Whiteman (1880-1967)

R
Boyd Raeburn (1913-1966)
Ray Reach (born 1948)
Don Redman (1900–1964) (Don Redman Orchestra, 1931–1940)
Alvino Rey (1908-2004)
Buddy Rich (1917–1987) (Buddy Rich Big Band)
Nelson Riddle (1921–1985)
Shorty Rogers (1924-1994) (Shorty Rogers and His Giants)

S
Sauter-Finegan Orchestra led by Eddie Sauter (1914-1981) and Bill Finegan (1917-2008)
Jan Savitt (1907-1948) (Jan Savitt & His Top Hatters, the Jan Savitt String Orchestra, Jan Savitt & His Orchestra)
Maria Schneider (born 1960) (Maria Schneider Orchestra)
Vic Schoen (1916-2000) (The Vic Schoen Orchestra)
Raymond Scott (1908-1994)
Ben Selvin (1898–1980)
Brian Setzer (born 1959) (The Brian Setzer Orchestra)
Artie Shaw (1910–2004)
Tom Smith (born 1957) (Unifour Jazz Ensemble)
John Philip Sousa (1858-1932)
Charlie Spivak (1905/07- 1982)
Sun Ra (1914–1993)

T
Lew Tabackin (born 1940)
Jack Teagarden (1905–1964) (Jack Teagarden and His Orchestra, 1939–1946)
Dan Terry  (1924-2011) 
Claude Thornhill (1908-1965)
Orrin Tucker (1911-2011) (Orrin Tucker and his Orchestra)
Tommy Tucker (1903-1989) (Tommy Tucker and his Orchestra)

V
Rudy Vallee (1901-1986) (The Connecticut Yankees)
Charlie Ventura (1916-1992)
Tommy Vig (born 1938)

W
Fred Waring (1900–1984) (Waring's Pennsylvanians)
Chick Webb (1905–1939)
Ted Weems (1901–1963)
Lawrence Welk (1903–1992)
Paul Whiteman (1890–1967)
Gerald Wilson (1918-2014)
Anna Mae Winburn (1913-1999)

Z
Si Zentner (1917-2000)
Zabuza(naruto days- Boruto days- SIke)

See also
Big band remote
List of big bands